CHST-FM is a Canadian radio station, broadcasting at 102.3 FM in London, Ontario. The station uses the on-air brand and format Jack 102.3. CHST broadcasts from the CFPL-TV tower in Southwest London. Due to CHST's low ERP relative to some London area radio stations, its broadcast signal covers only Middlesex, Elgin, and Oxford counties. The station's coverage to the west is impeded by co-channel WGRT in Port Huron, Michigan.

History
Approved by the CRTC in 1999, CHST was launched by CHUM Limited in 2000. It originally used the brand Star 102.3 with a hot adult contemporary format, but was rebranded as the adult hits format Bob FM in July 2003. The station was bought out by Glassbox Television in April 2005.

On June 21, 2010, CTVglobemedia and Glassbox announced it had entered into an agreement to sell the station to Rogers Media. The sale was approved by the CRTC on December 22, 2010.

On September 12, 2012, Rogers received approval to increase the station's effective radiated power from 5,840 to 20,400 watts (directional antenna with a maximum ERP from 12,100 to 100,000 watts), and change its class from B1 to C1.

Following the acquisition, the station continued to use the "Bob" name (which was associated with Bell Media stations) until August 28, 2014, when it adopted the Jack FM brand (as with other Rogers-owned adult hits stations).

References

External links
 
 
 

HST
HST
Jack FM stations
HST
Radio stations established in 2000
2000 establishments in Ontario